The 09003/09004 Bandra Rajdhani Express was a superfast train of Rajdhani service linking the National Capital of Delhi to Bandra in Mumbai.

History 
It was introduced on 16 October 2017 connecting the Bandra Terminus and Hazrat Nizamuddin for a 3-month Period.

It was given a Tri-weekly run. It was introduced with objective to cut the travel time between Mumbai and Delhi to under 14 Hours.

Mumbai Rajdhani takes 16 Hours 45 minutes while the August Kranti Rajdhani takes 17 Hours.

It had 2 Locomotives, 1 on front and other on back used Push-pull technique for faster acceleration.

It was hauled by Ghaziabad-based WAP7 end to end.

Route 
Bandra Terminus - Surat - Vadodara - Ratlam - Kota - Mathura - Hazrat Nizamuddin

Haults 
It had only 3 stops on its 1,367 km journey.

Surat

Vadodara

Kota

Service 
Bandra Rajdhani Express usually reached lits destination late.

In January 2018, Bandra Rajdhani Express was further extended till April 2018 for 3 months.

In May 2018, Its run was again extended till July 2018.

In July 2018, Rajdhani again extended till September 2018.

Termination 
In October 2018, Bandra Terminus Hazrat Nizamuddin Rajdhani Express was terminated due to frequently reaching Bandra delayed with low occupancy.

References 

Transport in Mumbai
Rail transport in Maharashtra
Rail transport in Gujarat